The Monument to Mosè Bianchi is a bronze statue of the painter Mosè Bianchi that stands on the Piazza di Pietro in Monza, region of Lombardy, Italy.

History
The sculptor Luigi Secchi, a close friend of the painter, was commissioned to create the monument, but only made the model. After the sculptor's death in 1921, thanks to a petition created by his student, Piero Da Verno, the statue was erected. The monument was unveiled on April 4, 1927. The statue depicts Bianchi, sitting with easel in one hand.

Statues in Italy
Buildings and structures in Monza
1927 sculptures
Monuments and memorials in Lombardy
Sculptures of men in Italy
Bronze sculptures in Italy